Ursicinus (also Hursannus, Ursitz, Oschanne, fl. 620) was an Irish missionary and  hermit in the Jura region.

Information
A vita of his is preserved in a redaction of the 11th century. According to this account, he was a disciple of Columbanus at Luxeuil who followed his master when he was banished from Burgundy in 610, but then retired as a hermit in the Doubs valley. Veneration of Ursicinus is attested since the 7th century.
In Grandval, a church was dedicated to Ursicinus in 675. By the 11th century, he was part of the local canon of saints of the Besançon diocese. His feast day is on 20 December. Ursicinus' supposed sarcophagus is preserved in St-Ursanne in what is now the canton of Jura in Switzerland.

References

Notes
Andreas Merkt, Ursicinus in Biographisch-Bibliographisches Kirchenlexikon, vol. 12 (1997).

External links
Catholic Online: Ursicinus of Saint-Ursanne
Saint of the Day, December 20: Ursicinus of Saint-Ursanne
 Sant' Ursicino del Giura

7th-century Irish priests
7th-century Christian saints
Canton of Jura
625 deaths
Medieval Irish saints on the Continent
Colombanian saints
Year of birth unknown